Sue Thomas: F.B.Eye is a Canadian/American television series that premiered in 2002 on the PAX Network. The show ended in May 2005 due to PAX's decision to halt the production of original programming. It was one of the two highest rated shows on the network.

Premise
Sue Thomas: F.B.Eye is loosely based on the real life experience of Sue Thomas, a deaf woman whose lip-reading expertise landed her a job with an elite surveillance team at the FBI.

Production
The series was created by Dave Alan Johnson and Gary R. Johnson for Pebblehut Productions. They also created Doc starring Billy Ray Cyrus for PAX. Yuri Yakubiw was the cinematographer and Bill Layton was the art director. Though set in Washington D.C., except for some exterior scenery shots, all the episodes were shot in and around Toronto, Ontario, Canada, and more than half of the cast and production crew were Canadian.

The series was once known as Lip Service. The show's theme song is "Who I Am", which is sung by Jessica Andrews and was written by Brett James and Troy Verges.

Cancellation
The abrupt ending to the show was due to PAX's decision to no longer produce original programming, rather than poor ratings. The last episode of the series ended with a title slate saying, "The End... for now."

Characters

Main

Sue Thomas
Sue Thomas (played by Deanne Bray) is a young deaf woman who is able to communicate in both English and American Sign Language. She applies, and is accepted, for a position with the FBI in Washington, D.C. She leaves her home in Ohio and drives to Washington, picking up her first hearing dog, Levi, en route.

Thomas' parents are concerned that she will not be able to cope with life so far from everything she has known, despite the fact that they have strongly encouraged her in living in both a hearing and deaf environment. Her mother fought for her daughter to have every opportunity to live life to the fullest, which has made Sue a very independent young woman. She speaks, signs, reads lips, plays the piano and ice skates (Although she has not done this professionally since her teens after her best friend died on a bus taking her to an ice skating championship; Sue was the better skater but couldn't match the music to the performance she was meant to be giving). Sue has a college degree from Springfield College in Springfield, Massachusetts.

Thomas arrives at her job only to find she has been assigned to "Special Projects", with the mundane task of analyzing fingerprints. However, she has no intention of wasting her life examining fingerprints and marches into the supposed personnel office to tell them exactly what she thinks. Having done this, she discovers the office has been relocated (but not on the directory board) and the man she was telling off is not personnel, but a Special Agent, Jack Hudson.  Impressed by her ambition, Hudson meets her at lunch, where he tests her skills by having her lip-read Myles who is seated some distance away outside. After which, Thomas is taken on as part of Hudson's "team", and she becomes a Special Investigative Analyst. She has some teething troubles early in her career, but quickly adapts to learn from her mistakes, using her lip-reading skills during various surveillance missions (although she has some difficulty lip-reading non-English speakers) while her approachable manner helps her appeal to various sources, regularly acting as the 'good cop' in interrogations.

Jack Hudson
Jack Hudson (played by Yannick Bisson) is the unit leader, and as such generally takes the lead in the team's cases. A lawyer from Wisconsin, he approaches his job as a Federal Agent with a burning drive. His experience as a sniper is revealed in the episode, "The Sniper". He is strongly attracted to Sue (who reciprocates) but unable to act due to their working relationship: he is her Training Agent and line manager. Everyone in the office can sense the extreme chemistry between the two, such as the team eagerly participating in a plan that involves Jack and Sue going undercover as a married couple or the female members of the team paying for Sue to win Jack in a charity bachelor auction, but Jack and Sue refuse to go against the Bureau's policy. In the last episode, during which Sue decides to leave, it becomes possible for them to get together. The two do have a firm, if complicated, friendship. His closest friends are Special Agents Manning and Gans.

Bobby Manning
Bobby Manning (played by Rick Peters) is a charming Australian. He provides a much-needed sense of humour and is best mates with Jack. They are similar ages and share a love of sports and the single life. Bobby is also a recovering gambling addict, and still attends Gamblers' Anonymous. However, only Jack knows about this, as it could effectively mean the end of Bobby's career with the FBI; Bobby experienced a relapse in "The Gambler", when an undercover operation required him to infiltrate a poker game to capture a notorious criminal, but after he lost most of the money donated by the FBI in a game outside the official match, he played one final game with the criminals he had been infiltrating to win back the money and then called the operation off. From the first season, Bobby dated Darcy D'Angelo (Polly Shannon), a journalist who initially wrote a very scathing story on the FBI before Bobby's genuinely emotional appeal won over her cynical point of view, but the two broke up in the third season when Darcy accepted an offer of a high-profile job in Los Angeles. Shortly after this, he and Tara discover a mutual attraction, and they eventually kiss in the episode "Troy Story", although they decide not to follow it up at the time. Bobby is highly protective of the women he works with. When he was a child, his father left his mother, but she has since remarried. Bobby is close to both his mother and stepfather, who still live someplace in Australia. He has a bitter relationship with his biological father, although it improves after his father helps the team track down a notorious criminal and returns to prison when he could have escaped. He is the only one in the office other than Myles who knows very few signs.

Dimitrius Gans
Dimitrius (played by Marc Gomes) is the father figure in the office, and the senior agent in terms of age and experience. He had a more sympathetic approach to Sue's mistakes early in her career; when she accidentally jeopardized a case when she broke into a suspect's garage without a legal warrant to acquire evidence that the suspect was involved in planning a bombing, Dimitrius helped Sue redeem her mistake by confirming that she saw the suspect mention a key contact outside his garage, at a location where Sue could clearly see him from outside the building with no warrant required for her observation. He is the only married member of the team, and has two children: Tanya and Davy. In season two his wife, Donna, suffered a miscarriage of what would have been their third child. "D" often assumes the role of acting supervisor when the unit's normal supervisor is called out of the office.

Myles Leland III
Myles (played by Ted Atherton) is a Harvard-educated Bostonian. He has a high opinion of both himself and his skills, and considers himself a cut above the rest of the team. He suffers a serious lack of a sense of humour, and is often the butt of the office jokes and other practical jokes. From the start he mistrusts Sue's place on the team and actively tries to have her removed when a new supervisor is appointed. This backfires, with the supervisor instead contemplating replacing Myles because he was seen as a disruptive influence on the team, and Sue ends up saving Myles' place on the team by arguing that he helps to keep them together even if he does this by driving the team to unite against him. Over time Myles' relationship with Sue improved significantly, and the character becomes more relaxed in the office after his near-death experience. He once dated Lucy, but when she found out he was cheating on her, she dumped him. Their working relationship is polite, but frosty. Myles has a difficult relationship with his parents and only recently started forging a proper relationship with his sister, Anne, after the team investigated a case in her law firm, noting that he was actually closer to Sue than Anne.

Lucy Dotson
Lucy (played by Enuka Okuma) is Sue's roommate and best friend. She is the team rotor, the unit's office manager and "base coordinator." Lucy was the first to have a close connection with Sue and was there to help encourage her and help her find her voice within her duties. She was the first to really attempt to get to know her on a personal level within the team even going as far as  becoming a student of ASL. She is close to her mother, although her father died some years ago. She gets involved when her mother is about to get married and she investigates her mother's suitor, eventually finding out that he's a con-man with multiple wives he's deserted. She is also close to her paternal grandmother. Lucy also dated Myles briefly, which ended badly when Sue discovered that Myles was cheating on Lucy. Lucy reunites with an old boyfriend, the only other man she dates in the show, and ends it abruptly with the realization that she's grown as a person and no longer suited for him. She's pleased with who she's becoming and at the end of the show she attributes part of her growth to Sue.

Tara Williams
Tara (played by Tara Samuel) is the unit's computer expert, adept at tracking perpetrators via bank records, computer hard drives, GPS tracking and other cyber-sources. Tara is a fully trained and armed Special Agent. However she can give the impression of being shy, dizzy, and a ditz when immersed in her world of computers. She is best friends with Lucy and Sue and they often go out together. By the second season, Tara manages to get a second monitor display for her computer so that Sue can see the information being displayed and read her colleagues' lips at the same time. Tara made her first kill in "Bad Hair Day", when a robber ran into a hair salon while Tara was getting a new haircut and threatened the customers, resulting in her suppressing her emotional reaction to the death until the robber's brother was caught as he attempted to kill Tara in revenge. Tara has dated Stanley Abbott, a steganographer who works for the National Security Agency. In a two-episode series, "The Actor" and "Planes, Trains, And Automobiles", Tara is interested in a movie star named Adam Kinsey. However, when Stanley shows up to help break a code and work with Tara, her relationship with Adam ends. In season three, she and Bobby Manning discover a mutual attraction.

Levi
Levi (played by "Jesse") is Sue's hearing dog, a golden retriever who was rescued after an abusive background that leaves him particularly jumpy around sudden loud noises, to the extent that the centre owners were doubtful he would ever be trainable. He is protective of Sue and loving to everyone, even going along with some of their jokes, such as when the team set up a small desk for Levi on Sue's first official day with the team. Several episodes find Levi in difficult and dramatic situations, such as getting lost in the city of D.C. after his new flea medication made him so hyperactive he ran away while staying with Charlie, or getting shot while trying to protect Sue (Jack actually used his credentials to get Levi treated in an actual hospital rather than a standard vet's). He is very clever, once managing to work a freight elevator when he became trapped inside a warehouse so that he could get to a different level and get out of the building and back to Sue, and has been trained to press the elevator buttons when given the right signal, as well as once being used to record key evidence to prove that a construction crew were performing shoddy work to let them steal houses. He is also playful, jumping onto her when drawing her attention to something, and is so dedicated to his job he tried to attract Sue's attention when he was in the hospital and had just awoken from a coma. The entire team adores him, which often leads to him being used to assist in minor pranks around the office. He is also a source of comfort during distressed or somber scenes in many episodes, usually placing his head on the suffering party's knee and whining empathetically.

Recurring
 Ted Garrett (Eugene Clark) – The team's supervisor, beginning with the season one episode "The Signing" through the midpoint of season three (16 episodes)
 Charlie Adams (Jack Jessop) – The owner of a garage and filling station, he was Sue's first friend in Washington when she went to his station after her car began acting up on the way into the city. He began to lose his hearing in the second season, which he had trouble accepting, but Sue encouraged him to get hearing aids. He once introduced the team to the daughter of an old friend of his who was a cop, thus directing the team to conclude a serial killer case where Charlie's friend had unwittingly arrested the wrong man. (9 episodes)
 Howie Fines (Jonathan Wilson) – Sue's first informant, a talkative sanguine, whose eager attitude often annoys the agents (8 episodes)
 Randy Pitts (Ed Sahely) – The bespectacled, nasal, and cynical finance manager who often clashes with Myles and occasionally the entire office, making Myles in particular jump through several hoops before conceding to their requests. In "Who Wants To Be a Millionaire", Randy approached Sue for help in learning a few signs after a woman he'd been communicating with online turned out to be deaf. In "Mind Games" he indirectly 'helped' the team deal with their incompetent temporary supervisor, Wayne Morris, the team tricking Wayne into exposing his true incompetence on record unless he resigned and accepted a relocation to Randy's department. (6 episodes)
 Troy Myers (Troy Kotsur) – Reformed criminal and former car thief who works for Charlie while studying at art school. He retains some of his old underworld contacts; one episode saw him putting the team in contact with a drug dealer who could prove that a DEA agent was corrupt after the agent tried to blame Sue for a botched sting operation. Another episode saw him reunited with his brother, the two having drifted apart in high school, when his brother revealed that his son and Troy's nephew was also deaf. He is played by Deanne Bray's husband (5 episodes)
 Stan Eldridge (Charles W. Gray) – The team's first supervisor; he was transferred to DoD in "The Signing"
 Amanda Duffman (Sammi Bourgeois) – A deaf girl who befriends Sue after seeing a talk Sue gave at her school; Amanda later came to the FBI to report a kidnapping, and even became the subject of a book written by an author who had initially contemplated shadowing Myles. She adopted a dog she found in a park when the original owner decided that he was unable to properly care for his pet. One episode saw her staying with Sue and Lucy for a week and seeking help in impressing a boy she had a crush on at school. (4 episodes)

Cameos
 Sue Thomas (the "real" one) appears in the episode "Billy The Kid". Thomas, a consultant of the show, plays a deaf actress named Deanne (a parody of lead actress Deanne Bray, who is also deaf). She meets Sue Thomas (Bray) in the hospital and has a quick chat with her. She also plays the role in the final episode. 
 Chantal Craig, who is married to Bisson (who plays Jack Hudson), appears in the episodes "The Signing", "Missing" and "The Hunter" as Lt./Det. Diana Grove, offering them information in a current case.

Episodes

Broadcast history
The television series premiered in the United States in 2002 on PAX TV and Canada in 2003 on CTV. The show ended in May 2005 due to PAX's decision to no longer produce original programming. It was one of the two highest rated shows on PAX.

In September 2009, Gospel Music Channel began running the show, airing Monday through Thursday at 8 p.m. EST. In October 2009, American Life Network began running the show, airing it Monday through Friday at 7 p.m. EST. But due to ALN's rebranding to Youtoo TV, the show was dropped. In 2010, it began airing on Alibi in the United Kingdom. In September 2020, Sony Channel began airing the series. Reruns also air regularly on CTV and VisionTV in Canada.

On September 9, 2012, INSP began airing the series. On October 1, 2012, BYUtv added the series to their broadcast schedule and aired it through May 1, 2015.

October 15, 2019 Start TV began airing the series.

DVD releases
Integrity Direct has begun releasing Sue Thomas: F.B. Eye on DVD in Region 1 for the very first time. Volume 1, featuring the first 11 episode from season one was released on November 10, 2009. Volumes 2–5, which feature the remaining season one episodes as well as all episodes from seasons two and three were released on May 18, 2010. In addition, a complete series box set featuring all 56 episodes of the series was also released on May 18, 2010.

References

External links

 
 
 Official page of real Sue Thomas

CTV Television Network original programming
PAX TV original programming
2002 American television series debuts
2002 Canadian television series debuts
2005 American television series endings
2005 Canadian television series endings
2000s American crime drama television series
2000s Canadian crime drama television series
Television shows filmed in Toronto
Sign language television shows
English-language television shows
Espionage television series
Television shows about deaf people